Open Sesame is the debut album by then 22 years old trumpeter Freddie Hubbard, recorded on June 19, 1960 by Rudy Van Gelder at his studio in Englewood Cliffs, NJ and released on the Blue Note label in 1960 in mono as BLP 4040 and in stereo as BST 84040. It features performances by Hubbard, Tina Brooks, McCoy Tyner, Sam Jones and Clifford Jarvis. In 1988, Capitol Records issued it on compact disc with Michael Cuscuna as reissue producer and in 2001, they released a version remastered by Rudy Van Gelder.

The Penguin Guide to Jazz has included Open Sesame as part of a selected  "Core Collection," and has summarized the album as "a great Blue Note set."  All Music gave it a four and a half star rating.

Track listing
 "Open Sesame" (Tina Brooks) - 7:11
 "But Beautiful" (Johnny Burke, Jimmy Van Heusen) - 6:26
 "Gypsy Blue" (Brooks) - 6:28
 "All or Nothing at All" (Arthur Altman, Jack Lawrence) - 5:36
 "One Mint Julep" (Rudy Toombs) - 6:04
 "Hub's Nub" (Hubbard) - 6:51
 "Open Sesame" [alternate take] (Brooks) - 7:16 Bonus track on CD
 "Gypsy Blue" [alternate take] (Brooks) - 7:35 Bonus track on CD

Personnel
Freddie Hubbard - trumpet
Tina Brooks - tenor saxophone
McCoy Tyner - piano
Sam Jones - bass
Clifford Jarvis - drums

References

1960 debut albums
Freddie Hubbard albums
Blue Note Records albums
Albums produced by Alfred Lion
Albums recorded at Van Gelder Studio